Oegoconia novimundi is a moth of the family Autostichidae. It is found in Spain, France, Germany, Austria, Slovakia, Belgium, Croatia, former Serbia and Montenegro, Italy, Bulgaria, Hungary, North Macedonia, Greece and on Corsica and the Azores.

References

Moths described in 1915
Oegoconia
Moths of Europe